"Foolin' Around" is a song by American R&B duo Changing Faces which was recorded for their debut album Changing Faces (1994). The song was released as the album's second single in November 1994.

Track listings
12", Vinyl
"Foolin' Around" (Extended Original Mix) – 4:27
"Foolin' Around" (Smoove's Remix) – 5:02
"Foolin' Around" (Instrumental) – 4:25
"Foolin' Around" (Whitehead's Remix) – 4:42
"Foolin' Around" (Big City Mix) – 4:57
"Foolin' Around" (Acapella) – 4:10

CD, Maxi
"Foolin' Around" (Extended Original Mix) – 4:30
"Foolin' Around" (Smoove's Remix) – 5:04
"Foolin' Around" (Whitehead's Remix) – 4:45
"Foolin' Around" (Big City Mix) – 4:59
"Foolin' Around" (Mokran's Short Mix) – 4:12
"Foolin' Around" (Instrumental) – 4:27
"Feelin' All This Love" (Remix)

Personnel
Information taken from Discogs.
additional production – Dave Bellochio, Michael Canter, Lafayette Carthon, Peter Mokran
co-production – Darryl "88 Fingers" Young
engineering – Paul "PE" Elliott, Stevo George, Peter Mokran
guitar – Keith Henderson
mixing – Peter Mokran, Jonnie Most
piano – Lafayette Carthon
production – R. Kelly, Kenny "Smooth" Kornegay
remixing – Dave Bellochio, Michael Canter, Lafayette Carthon, Kenny "Smoove" Kornegay, Peter Mokran, Kenny Whitehead
writing – R. Kelly, K. Kornegay, C. Lucas, C. Rose, D. Young

Chart performance

Notes

1994 singles
Changing Faces (group) songs
Song recordings produced by R. Kelly
Songs written by R. Kelly
1994 songs
Big Beat Records (American record label) singles
Contemporary R&B ballads